The 1973 Washington State Cougars football team was an American football team that represented Washington State University in the Pacific-8 Conference (Pac-8) during the 1973 NCAA Division I football season. In their sixth season under head coach Jim Sweeney, the Cougars compiled a 5–6 record (4–3 in Pac-8, fourth), and were outscored 290 to 250.

The team's statistical leaders included Chuck Peck with 1,023 passing yards, Andrew Jones with 1,059 rushing yards, and Tim Krause with 384 receiving yards.

The Cougars won their last four games, all in conference, which included a sweep of the three Northwest teams; the season concluded with a second consecutive win in the Apple Cup over Washington, this time a 52–26 rout on the road in Seattle.

Schedule

Roster

Season summary

at Kansas

at Arizona State

Idaho

at Ohio State

at USC

UCLA

at Stanford

Oregon

at Oregon State

California

at Washington

Chuck Peck 9/17, 249 Yds
Andrew Jones 139 Rush Yds
Most points ever scored against Washington

All-conference

Three Washington State players were named to the All-Pac-8 team: senior linebacker Tom Poe, junior guard Steve Ostermann, and junior center Geoff Reece. Ostermann was a repeat selection; he and Reece returned to the first team the next year.

NFL Draft
Three Cougars were selected in the 1974 NFL Draft

References

External links
 Game program: Idaho at WSU – September 29, 1973

Washington State
Washington State Cougars football seasons
Washington State Cougars football